The Sanremo Music Festival 1988 was the 38th annual Sanremo Music Festival, held at the Teatro Ariston in Sanremo, province of Imperia, between 24 and 27 February 1988 and broadcast by Rai 1.

The winner of the Big Artists section was  Massimo Ranieri with the song "Perdere l'amore".

The pop group Future won the "Newcomers" section with the song "Canta con noi", and Fiorella Mannoia won the Critics Award with the song "Le notti di Maggio".

Participants and results

Big Artists

Newcomers

Notes

References 

Sanremo Music Festival by year
1988 in Italian music
1988 music festivals